Cathy Cahlin Ryan (born 1971) is an American actress. She played the role of Corrine Mackey on the police drama The Shield in all seven seasons, and was credited as part of the main cast during seasons 5-7.

A native of Miami, Florida, Ryan has also appeared in the television productions Numb3rs, Judging Amy, Family Matters, Monk, The Unit, Severence Pay, Roseanne: Portrait of a Domestic Goddess, Lie to Me (Season 2, Episode 19), The Chicago Code and a guest appearance as a woman taken hostage on Slaughterhouse, the Justified season 3 finale.

She is married to Shawn Ryan, creator of The Shield and The Chicago Code.

References

External links

Living people
1971 births
Place of birth missing (living people)
American television actresses
21st-century American women